Alyaksey Ivanow (born 19 February 1997) is a Belarusian footballer who plays for Slavia Mozyr.

Honours
Dinamo Brest
Belarusian Cup winner: 2016–17, 2017–18

Gomel
Belarusian Cup winner: 2021–22

References

External links

Profile at Pressball website

1997 births
Living people
Belarusian footballers
Association football defenders
FC Minsk players
FC Dynamo Brest players
FC Luch Minsk (2012) players
FC Gomel players
FC Torpedo-BelAZ Zhodino players
FC Slavia Mozyr players